In organic chemistry annulation (from the Latin anellus for "little ring"; occasionally annelation) is a chemical reaction in which a new ring is constructed on a molecule.

Examples are the Robinson annulation, Danheiser annulation and certain cycloadditions.  Annular molecules are constructed from side-on condensed cyclic segments, for example helicenes and acenes.  In transannulation a bicyclic molecule is created by intramolecular carbon-carbon bond formation in a large monocyclic ring. An example is the samarium(II) iodide induced ketone - alkene cyclization of 5-methylenecyclooctanone which proceeds through a ketyl intermediate:

Benzannulation
The term benzannulated compounds refers to derivatives of cyclic compounds (usually aromatic) which are fused to a benzene ring. Examples are listed in the table below:

In contemporary chemical literature, the term benzannulation also means "construction of benzene rings from acyclic precursors".

Transannular interaction
A transannular interaction in chemistry is any chemical interaction (favorable or nonfavorable) between different non-bonding molecular groups in a large ring or macrocycle. See for example atranes.

References

Organic reactions
Ring forming reactions